Hinds Community College is a public community college with its main campus in Raymond, Mississippi and branches in Jackson, Pearl, Utica, and Vicksburg. The Hinds Community College District includes Hinds County, Claiborne County, part of Copiah County, Rankin County, and Warren County. With an enrollment of over 12,000 students at six campuses, it is the largest community college in Mississippi.

Academics
The college currently provides academic college-level courses for the first two years of four-year degree programs that must be completed at senior colleges or universities. It also provides two-year technical degree programs, post-secondary career (formerly called "vocational") programs, secondary (high-school) career education, and short-term training and continuing education.

History
The Utica campus of Hinds Community College, formerly "Utica Junior College, was founded in 1903 as Utica Normal and Industrial Institute. William H. Holtzclaw helped establish jt. and it began as a small agricultural high school in 1917 with 117 students and eight faculty members. In its transformation into a junior college, it began offering college-level academic courses in 1922 and was accredited by the Southern Association of Colleges and Schools in 1926.

During the World War II years, a vocational education curriculum was added to the college's offerings, and in the late 1960s, technical degree programs were added.

Branch locations in Jackson and Vicksburg were opened in the 1970s. These branches primarily offered high school vocational education, though some college-level night courses were taught. Utica Junior College, a historically black college whose history dates to 1903, merged with Hinds Junior College''' in 1982 under Federal court order as part of a class action racial discrimination lawsuit.

The Pearl-Rankin Vocational/Career Center was opened in the city of Pearl in 1983, offering high school vocational education and some college-level night courses. This branch later became the Rankin Campus; it now offers academic, technical, and career programs.

The Jackson Campus-Nursing/Allied Health Center was opened in Jackson in 1984, offering nursing and other medical and dental programs. This center, together with the existing branch in Jackson, became known as the Jackson Campus. A Resource and Coordinating Unit for Economic Development (RCU) was added in 1988 in Raymond, and the Eagle Ridge Conference Center was opened in 1996 under the administration of the RCU. The Vicksburg branch became the Vicksburg Campus in 2002 and now offers college-level programs.

Hinds Junior College changed its name to Hinds Community College in 1987; that year 13 of the 14 other Mississippi public two-year colleges also adopted the "community" label. Hinds linked up with other two-year colleges by means of the Community College Network (CCN) in 1994. This system allows a course to be offered at one college location while students may participate in the course at several other college locations by means of video conferencing. All of the state public two-year colleges formed the Mississippi Virtual Community College (MVCC) in 1999 to offer courses to students over the Internet.

Campuses
 Raymond Campus, Raymond
 Academic/Technical Center, Jackson
 Nursing/Allied Health Center, Jackson
 Rankin Campus, Pearl
 Utica Campus, unincorporated Hinds County, south of Utica
 Vicksburg-Warren Campus, Vicksburg
 Aviation Maintenance/Commercial Aviation, John Bell Williams Airport, Raymond

Hinds Agricultural High School, at the Utica campus, was previously operated by the community college.

Notable alumni
Maurice Black, legislator, Assistant Attorney General of Mississippi
Anquan Boldin, professional football player
Chad Bradford, professional baseball player
Corey Bradford, professional football player
Phil Bryant, 64th Governor of Mississippi
Malcolm Butler, professional football player
John Copeland, professional football player
Beasley Denson, former Tribal Chief of the Mississippi Band of Choctaw Indians
Antonio Gibson, professional football player
Jeff Henderson, 2016 Rio Olympics Gold Medalist in long jump
Faith Hill, Country music singer
John Hightower, professional football player
Grady Jackson, professional football player
Rory Johnson, professional football player
Tommy Kelly, professional football player
Trell Kimmons, sprinter
Earl Leggett, professional football player
Leon Lett, professional football player
Ryan McBean, professional football player
Jerome McDougle, professional football player
Mary Ann Mobley, Miss America 1959 - first Mississippian to win beauty pageant
Joseph G. Moss, state legislator and judge for whom the school's athletic field is named
Michael Myers, professional football player
Derek Newton, professional football player
Greg Peterson, professional football player
Thomas Hal Phillips, author, screenwriter, and actor
Pat Rapp, professional baseball player
Fred Smoot, professional football player
T. T. Toliver, professional football player
Charvarius Ward, professional football player
Marvin Washington, professional football player
Jeremy Williams, professional football player
John Bell Williams, former Governor of Mississippi
Zig Ziglar, motivational speaker and author

References

Further reading
 Hinds Community College. History of Hinds Community College''. 16 August 2006.

External links

 Official website

 
Universities and colleges in the Jackson metropolitan area, Mississippi
Educational institutions established in 1917
Universities and colleges accredited by the Southern Association of Colleges and Schools
Buildings and structures in Hinds County, Mississippi
1917 establishments in Mississippi